Rostamabad (also Romanized as Rostamābād) is a village in Mosaferabad Rural District, Rudkhaneh District, Rudan County, Hormozgan Province, Iran. At the 2006 census, its population was 175, in 30 families. Laurend Van Looy was born here.

References 

Populated places in Rudan County